William Paul Lundigan (June 12, 1914 – December 20, 1975) was an American film actor. His more than 125 films include Dodge City (1939), The Fighting 69th (1940), The Sea Hawk (1940), Santa Fe Trail (1940), Dishonored Lady (1947), Pinky (1949), Love Nest (1951) with Marilyn Monroe, The House on Telegraph Hill (1951), I'd Climb the Highest Mountain (1951) and Inferno (1953).

Biography
Growing up in Syracuse, New York, Lundigan was the oldest of four sons. His father, Michael F. Lundigan, owned a shoe store (at which Lundigan worked) in the same building as a local radio station, WFBL.  Becoming fascinated by radio, he was playing child roles on radio and producing radio plays at 16.

A graduate of Nottingham High School, Lundigan studied law at Syracuse University, earning money as a radio announcer at WFBL. He graduated and passed the bar examination before events changed his career path. Charles Rogers, a Universal Pictures production chief, heard Lundigan's voice, met him, arranged a screen test and signed him to a motion picture contract in 1937.

Universal
He was in Armored Car (1937) billed as "Larry Parker". Then his name was changed to "William Lundigan" for West Bound Limited (1937).

Lundigan was billed third in The Lady Fights Back (1937) then promoted to male lead for That's My Story! (1937). He was back down the cast list for The Black Doll (1938) and Reckless Living (1938) but was the male lead for State Police (1938). He had support parts in Wives Under Suspicion (1938) directed by James Whale, Danger on the Air (1938), The Missing Guest (1938), and Freshman Year (1938).

Lundigan was one of the romantic leads in Three Smart Girls Grow Up (1939). He was borrowed by Warners for a support part in Dodge City (1939).

Lundigan was top billed in They Asked for It (1939) then was Sigrid Gurie's leading man in The Forgotten Woman (1939). He supported in Legion of Lost Flyers (1939). He said "nothing much happened" of his time at Universal and left the studio.

Warner Bros
Lundigan signed with Warner Bros, where he had support roles in The Old Maid (1939), The Fighting 69th (1940), 3 Cheers for the Irish (1940), The Man Who Talked Too Much (1940), Young America Flies (1940, a short), The Sea Hawk (1940), Service with the Colors (1940, a short), East of the River (1940), and Santa Fe Trail (1940).

Lundigan later described this period as "I was always turning up as Olivia de Havilland's weak brother. Well, I got in a rut - that old bugaboo, type casting - and made one quickie after another."

Warners promoted him to the lead of some "B"s, The Case of the Black Parrot (1941) and A Shot in the Dark (1941); he was support in The Great Mr. Nobody (1941), Highway West (1941) and International Squadron (1941).

Lundigan then had a lead in Sailors on Leave (1941) for Republic Pictures.

MGM
Lundigan went to MGM where he had support roles in The Bugle Sounds (1942) and The Courtship of Andy Hardy (1942). He was promoted to the lead of a "B", Sunday Punch (1942) and had the second lead in Apache Trail (1942) and Northwest Rangers (1942).

He reprised his role from the Andy Hardy series in Andy Hardy's Double Life (1942) and supported in Dr. Gillespie's Criminal Case (1943) and Salute to the Marines (1943). Republic asked him back to play the lead in Headin' for God's Country (1943).

World War Two
He enlisted in the U.S. Marine Corps for World War II and served as a combat cameraman in the Battle of Peleliu and the Battle of Okinawa, returning at war's end as a Corporal. He was wounded on Okinawa.

Post War

Lundigan returned to Hollywood and tried freelancing. He had support roles in some independent movies, The Fabulous Dorseys (1947) and Dishonored Lady (1947). He was the leading man in Republic's The Inside Story (1948) and was top billed in Mystery in Mexico (1948), State Department: File 649 (1949) and Follow Me Quietly (1949). He decided to try acting on stage and was cast by John Ford in a revival of What Price Glory?.

20th Century Fox
Lundigan's career revived when he successfully auditioned for the role of Jeanne Crain's romantic interest in Pinky (1949) at 20th Century Fox, initially directed by Ford (Elia Kazan took over). The movie was a huge hit and the studio signed him to a long-term contract. He went on to be leading man to Dorothy McGuire in Mother Didn't Tell Me (1950), June Haver in I'll Get By (1950) and Love Nest (1951), Susan Hayward in I'd Climb the Highest Mountain (1951).

He was also in The House on Telegraph Hill (1951) and Elopement (1951), and was the male lead in Down Among the Sheltering Palms (1952) and Serpent of the Nile (1953).  The New York Times called him "the male counterpart to the girl next door".

He had a good part in Inferno (1953).

Television

Lundigan began appearing on TV shows like Lux Video Theatre, Schlitz Playhouse, General Electric Theater, The Ford Television Theatre, and The Star and the Story and was host for Climax! and Shower of Stars.

He had the lead in some low budget films like Riders to the Stars (1954), Dangerous Voyage (1954) and The White Orchid (1954), the latter for Reginald Le Borg. He mostly worked on television now, such as episodes of Science Fiction Theatre, Playhouse 90 and Westinghouse Desilu Playhouse, and travelled the country extensively selling automobiles.

From September 30, 1959, to September 7, 1960, Lundigan portrayed Col. Edward McCauley in the CBS television series, Men into Space.

In 1961, Lundigan was cast as Nathaniel Norgate in the episode, "Dangerous Crossing", on the syndicated anthology series, Death Valley Days, hosted by Stanley Andrews. The story focuses on religious settlers who encounter outlaws operating an illegal tollgate.

He had the lead in The Underwater City (1962) and guest starred on The Dick Powell Theatre , Run for Your Life, Medical Center and Marcus Welby, M.D.. His last film was The Way West (1967).

Politics
In 1963 and 1964, Lundigan joined fellow actors Walter Brennan, Chill Wills, and Efrem Zimbalist, Jr., in making appearances on behalf of U.S. Senator Barry M. Goldwater, the Republican nominee in the campaign against U.S. President Lyndon B. Johnson.

Lundigan himself waged an unsuccessful campaign for a nominally non-partisan seat on the Los Angeles City Council.

Family
Lundigan married Rena Morgan, and they had a daughter, Anastasia.

Death
Lundigan died at the age of 61 of apparent heart failure at City of Hope Medical Center in Duarte, California.

Radio appearances
1951 Screen Guild Players ("Apartment for Peggy")
1952 Stars in the Air ("Deep Waters")

Filmography

1937: Armored Car as Henry Hutchins
1937: West Bound Limited as Dispatcher
1937: The Lady Fights Back as Doug McKenzie
1937: That's My Story as Howard Field
1937: A Girl with Ideas as Herman (uncredited)
1937: Prescription for Romance as Officer (uncredited)
1938: The Jury's Secret as Announcer (uncredited)
1938: The Black Doll as Rex Leland
1938: Reckless Living as Stanley Shaw
1938: The Crime of Doctor Hallet as Party Guest (uncredited)
1938: State Police as Pvt. Smith / Bill Clarke
1938: Sinners in Paradise as Radio Announcer (voice, uncredited)
1938: Wives Under Suspicion as Phil
1938: Danger on the Air as Dave Chapman
1938: Letter of Introduction as Minor Role (uncredited)
1938: The Missing Guest as Larry Dearden
1938: Freshman Year as Bob Potter
1939: Three Smart Girls Grow Up as Richard Watkins
1939: Dodge City as Lee Irving
1939: They Asked for It as Steve Lewis
1939: The Forgotten Woman as Terence Kennedy
1939: The Old Maid as Lanning Halsey
1939: Legion of Lost Flyers as Ralph Perry
1940: The Fighting 69th as Timmy Wynn
1940: Three Cheers for the Irish as Michael Flaherty
1940: The Man Who Talked Too Much as John L. Forbes
1940: Young America Flies (Short) as Bill Brown
1940: The Sea Hawk as Danny Logan
1940: Service with the Colors (Short) as Thomas Stanton
1940: East of the River as Nicholas Antonio 'Nick' Lorenzo
1940: Santa Fe Trail as Bob Holliday
1941: The Case of the Black Parrot as Jim Moore
1941: The Great Mr. Nobody as Richard Amesworth
1941: A Shot in the Dark as Peter Kennedy
1941: Highway West as Dave Warren
1941: International Squadron as Lt. Rog Wilkins
1941: Sailors on Leave as Chuck Stephens
1942: The Bugle Sounds as Joe 'Joey' Hanson
1942: The Courtship of Andy Hardy as Jeff Willis
1942: Sunday Punch as Ken Burke
1942: Apache Trail as Tom Folliard
1942: Northwest Rangers as James Kevin Gardiner
1942: Andy Hardy's Double Life as Jeff Willis
1943: Dr. Gillespie's Criminal Case as Alvin F. Peterson
1943: Salute to the Marines as Rufus Cleveland
1943: Headin' for God's Country as Michael Banyan
1947: The Fabulous Dorseys as Bob Burton
1947: Dishonored Lady as Jack Garet
1948: The Inside Story as Waldo 'Bill' Williams
1948: Mystery in Mexico as Steve Hastings
1949: State Department: File 649 as Ken Seely
1949: Follow Me Quietly as Police Lt. Harry Grant
1949: Pinky as Dr. Thomas Adams
1950: Mother Didn't Tell Me as Dr. William Wright
1950: I'll Get By as William Spencer
1951: I'd Climb the Highest Mountain as Rev. William Asbury Thompson
1951: The House on Telegraph Hill as Major Marc Bennett
1951: Love Nest as Jim Scott
1951: Elopement as Matt Reagan
1953: Down Among the Sheltering Palms as Capt. W.W. 'Bill' Willoby
1953: Serpent of the Nile as Lucilius
1953: Lux Video Theatre (TV Series) as Jim
1953: Inferno as Joseph Duncan
1953–1954: Ford Television Theatre (TV Series) as Nels Wolcott / Bart Sayer
1954: Riders to the Stars as Dr. Richard Stanton
1954: Schlitz Playhouse of Stars (TV Series) as Jack Fuller
1954: General Electric Theater (TV Series) as Charlie
1954: Dangerous Voyage as Peter Duncan
1954: Shower of Stars (TV Series) as Host
1954: The White Orchid as Robert Burton
1954–1958: Climax! (TV Series) as Himself - Host
1955: Fireside Theatre (TV Series) as Sam Weston
1955: The Star and the Story (TV Series) as Edward Mansell
1955: Science Fiction Theatre (TV Series) as Maj. Fred Gunderman
1958: Playhouse 90 (TV Series) as Ben Gammon
1958: Westinghouse Desilu Playhouse (TV Series) as David Pierce
1959–1960: Men Into Space (TV Series) as Col. Edward McCauley
1961: Death Valley Days (TV Series) as Nathaniel Norgate
1962: The Underwater City as Bob Gage
1963: The Dick Powell Theatre (TV Series) as Frank Jeffers
1966: Run for Your Life (TV Series) as David Phillips
1967: The Way West as Michael Moynihan
1968: Where Angels Go, Trouble Follows as Mr. Clancy (uncredited)
1971: Medical Center (TV Series) as Willoughby
1971: Marcus Welby, M.D. (TV Series) as Jack Crowley (final appearance)

References

External links

1914 births
1975 deaths
Nottingham High School (Syracuse, New York) alumni
American male television actors
American male film actors
Burials at Holy Cross Cemetery, Culver City
Male actors from Los Angeles County, California
Male actors from Syracuse, New York
United States Marines
California Republicans
20th-century American male actors
New Right (United States)
United States Marine Corps personnel of World War II